Haydar Mirza Safavi (also spelled Haidar Mirza Safavi) was a Safavid prince, who declared himself as the king (shah) of Iran on 15 May 1576, the following day after his father Tahmasp I had died. He was, however, during the same day killed by the Qizilbash tribes that favored his brother Ismail Mirza Safavi as the successor of their father. His mother was Sultanzadeh Khanum, a Georgian lady.

Biography 

Haydar Mirza was born on 18 September 1554 to Tahmasp I and Sultanzadeh Khanum, a Georgian lady. His mother was a sister of the Georgian converts Aman Beg (an influential nobleman) and Ali Khan Beg.

On 18 October 1574, Tahmasp I became ill—during his illness, he was close to dying two times, and he still hadn't chosen a successor. Thus the main chieftains of the Qizilbash arranged a meeting to discuss about who should be the successor. The Ustalju clan, and the Shaykhavand clan (which was related to the Safavid family) favored Haydar Mirza. The Georgians also supported him, since his mother was Georgian.

The Rumlu, Afshar, and the Qajar clan favored Ismail Mirza Safavi, who was jailed in the Qahqaheh Castle. Tahmasp's daughter Pari Khan Khanum also favored Ismail Mirza. While Tahmasp was still ill, those who supported Haydar Mirza, sent a message to the castellan of Qahqaheh Castle, named Khalifa Ansar Qaradghlu. They requested him to have Ismail Mirza killed. However, Pari Khan Khanum managed to find out about it and told Tahmasp about the plot. Tahmasp, who still had some feelings for Ismail Mirza due to the courage he used to have in the battles with the Ottoman Empire, sent a group of Afshar musketeers to the Qahqaheh Castle to protect him. Two months later, Tahmasp recovered from the life-threatening illness he had. Two years later, on 14 May 1576, he died in Qazvin. Haydar Mirza was the only son who was with him when he died, and thus the following day, he announced himself as the new king. Normally, some Qizilbash tribes would guard the royal palace and take turns with other others—unfortunately for Haydar Mirza, on that day all the Qizilbash guards were either from the Rumlu, Afshar, Qajar, Bayat, or the Dorsaq tribe—all loyal supporters of Ismail Mirza.

When Haydar Mirza found out about the dangerous position he was in, he took Pari Khan Khanum (who was also in the palace) "into custody as a precautionary measure" (Parsadust). Pari Khan Khanum then "threw herself at her brother's feet in the presence of Haydar Mirza's mother", and tried to urge him to let her leave the palace, stating that she was the first to acknowledge his rule by making a prostrating to him—she vowed that she would attempt to persuade Ismail Mirza's supporters to change their mind, which included her full brother Suleiman Mirza and her Circassian uncle Shamkhal Sultan. Haydar Mirza accepted her request, and gave her permission to leave the palace. However, after she left the palace, she broke her oath and gave Shamkhal the keys to the gate of the palace.

When the supporters of Haydar Mirza found out about the threat their king was in, they hurried to his royal residence to save him. However, the palace guards, who disliked Haydar Mirza (although he had tried to win them to his side by making several promises) closed the entrances of the palace. At the same time, the supporters of Ismail Mirza, entered the palace and went to its inner part. However, Haydar Mirza's supporters shortly managed to break through the gate, but did not reach there in time—Ismail Mirza's supporters found Haydar Mirza, dressed as a woman in the royal harem. He was immediately captured and beheaded. His bloody head was then thrown down to Haydar Mirza's  supporters, who stopped their resistance, which thus meant that Ismail Mirza could safely ascend the throne.

References

Sources 

 
 
 
 
 
 
 
 
 
 
 

Safavid princes
Iranian people of Georgian descent
1554 births
1576 deaths
16th-century people of Safavid Iran